Ahmed Eid Maher Beirakdar (born 2 May 1955) is a Syrian footballer. He competed in the men's tournament at the 1980 Summer Olympics.

References

External links
 

1955 births
Living people
Syrian footballers
Syria international footballers
Olympic footballers of Syria
1980 AFC Asian Cup players
1988 AFC Asian Cup players
Footballers at the 1980 Summer Olympics
Place of birth missing (living people)
Association football goalkeepers
Mediterranean Games gold medalists for Syria
Mediterranean Games medalists in football
Competitors at the 1987 Mediterranean Games